Saskia Holmkvist (born 1971) is a conceptual artist from Sweden, working mainly with video. She is best known for the short films "System" (2001) and "Interview With Saskia Holmkvist" (2005).

Notable works
 Interview With Saskia Holmkvist  (2005)
 System  (2001)

External links
Saskia Holmkvist, Arnolfini Gallery, frieze.com, May 2008
Moderna Museet
Saskia Holmkvist website

1971 births
Living people
Swedish contemporary artists
Swedish video artists
Swedish artists